This is a list of notable Scouts and Scouters.

Africa

Ghana

Kenya

Libya

Morocco

Rwanda

South Africa

Asia

Bangladesh

Cambodia

China

Hong Kong

India

Indonesia

Iran

Japan

Korea

Maldives

Philippines

Singapore

Sri Lanka

Thailand

Vietnam

Vietnamese Scouting in exile

Eurasia

Armenia

Azerbaijan

Europe

Austria

Belgium

Czech Republic

Denmark

France

Greece

Hungary and Hungarian Scouting

Iceland

Ireland

Italy

Netherlands

Norway

Poland

Serbia

Sweden

Switzerland

Turkey

United Kingdom

Baden-Powell Scouts Association

Girlguiding UK

The Scout Association

Latin America

Argentina

Brazil

Chile

Cuba

Ecuador

Mexico

Peru

Venezuela

Middle East

Egypt

Israel

Lebanon

Syria

North America

Bahamas

Canada

United States

Girl Scouts of the USA
These notable individuals were in the Girl Scouts of the USA (GSUSA). Also see Gold Award recipients.

Boy Scouts of America

These notable individuals were in the Boy Scouts of America (BSA). Also see the lists of Eagle Scouts, Recipients of the Silver Buffalo Award, Chief Scout Executives, National presidents of the Boy Scouts of America and National Commissioner.

Honorary Scouts
In 1911, President William Howard Taft accepted the position of honorary president of the BSA, and each U.S. president since has served. Theodore Roosevelt was the only honorary vice-president, as he had left office before the honorary presidency began.

In 1927, the Boy Scouts of America created Honorary Scouts to distinguish "American citizens whose achievements in outdoor activity, exploration and worthwhile adventure are of such an exceptional character as to capture the imagination of boys...". The eighteen who were awarded this distinction were:

Puerto Rico

Oceania

Australia

New Zealand

See also

 List of Alpha Phi Omega members

Notes

External links

References
 
 
 
 
 
 
 
 
 

Scouting and Guiding by country
Lists of people involved in Scouting